Courage is a 2011 Polish action film directed by Greg Zglinski.

The film was shot in Łódź from July to August 26, 2010.

Plot 
Alfred and Jerzy take part in a brutal incident: during a train ride, a couple of hooligans harass a young woman. Jerzy stands in her defense. Alfred hesitates and becomes a helpless bystander as his younger brother is thrown off the moving train. 'Courage' is about people whose lives get disturbed by a violent act, which forces them to reveal who they really are.

Cast 
 Robert Więckiewicz as Alfred Firlej
 Łukasz Simlat as Jerzy Firlej
 Gabriela Muskała as Viola Firlej
 Marian Dziędziel as Stefan Firlej
  as Anna Firlej

References

External links 

2011 action films
2011 films
Polish action films